Hiccups is a Canadian television series created by Corner Gas star Brent Butt, who is also the writer, show runner, and executive producer of the program. The series was produced by Laura Lightbown and David Storey and airs on CTV and The Comedy Network. The pilot was shot in late March 2009 with the rest of the series to begin shooting in September 2009. The show premiered on CTV on March 1, 2010; the same night as Dan for Mayor, a series starring fellow Corner Gas alumnus Fred Ewanuick. Hiccups returned for a second season on May 30, 2011 at 8pm ET. CTV did not renew Hiccups and Dan for Mayor for a third season.

Synopsis
The series stars Nancy Robertson (a Corner Gas co-star and Butt's wife) in the role of Millie Upton. Millie is the successful author of a series of children's books about characters called "Grumpaloos". Millie has anger management issues, which are referred to as "hiccups," giant outbursts and could be described as a giant fit of depression. These outbursts are immediate, so they are prone to happen at any time. After being told that she needs some help controlling her anger issues, Millie finds a man named Stan Dirko (Butt), whom she hires as her life coach. Stan is significantly underqualified for his profession, which Millie never notices.

Characters
Nancy Robertson as Millie Upton, a neurotic, emotionally-unstable children's author who is often happy but quick to anger.
Brent Butt as Stan Dirko, Millie's life coach. Stan is a bit of a loveable loser, geeky, and quirky.
Laura Soltis as Joyce Haddison, Millie's publisher; a serious, thriving businessperson surrounded by colourful characters.
David Ingram as Taylor Rymes, Millie's literary agent; a slick, smooth-talking, conceited guy who is more interested in women than his job.
Emily Perkins as Crystal Braywood, a spoiled, sarcastic rich girl who strongly dislikes her job as Joyce's receptionist.
Paula Rivera as Anna Dirko, Stan's loveable wife, a professional gardener.

Episodes

Season 1 (2010)

Season 2 (2011)

Webisodes
A series of 10 webisodes was produced and premiered on the official Hiccups YouTube channel.

Home release
Entertainment One released Season One on DVD in Region 1 on January 11, 2011.

Reception
Rob Salem of the Toronto Star stated that, "What the network may perceive as Hiccups' greatest asset turns out to be its greatest liability. Butt's appearance onscreen – which he was, I gather, reluctantly persuaded to do by the network – is a distraction from this singular showcase for his wife's considerable comedic skills."

Canadian ratings

Seasonal ratings

Episodic ratings

Awards and nominations

References

External links

 Official website
 Hiccups at CTV.ca
 

CTV Television Network original programming
2010s Canadian sitcoms
2010 Canadian television series debuts
2011 Canadian television series endings
CTV Comedy Channel original programming
Television shows filmed in Vancouver
Television shows set in Vancouver
Television series by Bell Media
English-language television shows